HMS Bellona was one of two  scout cruisers built for the Royal Navy in the first decade of the 20th century. The ship served as the flotilla leader for the 2nd Destroyer Flotilla from her completion in 1910 until 1913 when she was transferred to the 1st Battle Squadron. Bellona spent the bulk of World War I with that squadron. She was present at, but did not fight in, the Battle of Jutland in mid-1916. The ship was converted into a minelayer in mid-1917 and made four sorties to lay her mines before the end of the war. Bellona was reduced to reserve in 1919 and sold to be broken up for scrap in 1921.

Design and description
Designed to provide destroyer flotillas with a command ship, Bellona proved too slow in service from the start of her career. Her  speed was barely capable of matching the speeds of the  destroyers she led in her flotilla in 1909 and proved inadequate to match the speed of later destroyers.

She was powered by two sets of Parsons steam turbines, each driving two shafts. Her crew consisted of 317 officers and ratings.

Her main armament consisted of six breech-loading (BL) four-inch (102 mm) Mk VII guns. The forward pair of guns were mounted side by side on a platform on the forecastle, the middle pair were amidships, one on each broadside, and the two remaining guns were on the centreline of the quarterdeck, one ahead of the other. Her secondary armament consisted of four quick-firing (QF) 3-pounder Vickers Mk I guns and two submerged 21-inch (533 mm) torpedo tubes. During the war, four additional four-inch guns were added amidships to increase her firepower. A QF three-inch (76 mm) 20-cwt anti-aircraft gun was also added. In 1918 it was replaced by a four-inch gun.

As a scout cruiser, the ship was only lightly protected to maximise her speed. Her conning tower was protected by four inches of armour.

Construction and service 

Bellona, the sixth ship of that name, was ordered as part of the 1907 Naval Programme and was laid down on No. 5 Slipway at Pembroke Royal Dockyard on 15 June 1908 by Mrs. Kingsford, wife of the Captain-Superintendent of the dockyard, Rear-Admiral Henry Kingsford. The ship was launched on 20 March 1909 by Lady Leonora, wife of John Philips, Baron St Davids. She was completed in February 1910 under the command of Captain Edwyn Alexander-Sinclair, commander of the 2nd Destroyer Flotilla. He was relieved by Captain The Honourable Hubert Brand on 7 February 1911. Captain Reginald Tyrwhitt replaced him on 10 August 1912. The ship had been transferred to the 1st Battle Squadron as of 18 June 1913 and Captain Percy Royds assumed command on 5 July.

She was still assigned to the 1st Battle Squadron of the Grand Fleet in Scapa Flow at the start of World War I. On 17 December 1914, Bellona collided with the destroyer leader ,  although both ships were seriously damaged, there were no deaths. Captain Arthur Dutton relieved Royds on 24 April 1916. Bellona was at the Battle of Jutland but was assigned to a position at the rear of the squadron and did not fire her guns. Dutton was relieved in his turn by Captain Claud Sinclair on 28 August and was replaced by Captain Ernest Denison on 1 February 1917. The ship was on detached duty by May, probably for her conversion to a minelayer the following month, and was briefly assigned to the 4th Battle Squadron by July before rejoining the 1st Battle Squadron in August. Bellonas stay was destined to short-lived as the ship was transferred to the 2nd Battle Squadron by October. Bellona laid mines at the entrance to the Kattegat on the nights of 18/19 and 24/25 February 1918, part of her total of 306 mines laid in four missions. Captain Theodore Bigg relieved Denison on 15 November. After the war, the ship was relieved of her assignment with the 2nd Battle Squadron and assigned to Devonport Dockyard in February 1919 and placed in reserve there the following month. By 18 December, she had been listed for sale and sold for scrap on 9 May 1921 to Thos. W. Ward at Lelant.

Notes

Footnotes

Bibliography

External links
 
 Boadicea class in World War I
 History of HMS Bellona
 Battle of Jutland Crew Lists Project - HMS Bellona Crew List

 

Boadicea-class cruisers
World War I cruisers of the United Kingdom
1909 ships
Ships built in Pembroke Dock